Cyanocrates is a genus of moths of the family Xyloryctidae.

Species
 Cyanocrates inventrix Meyrick, 1925
 Cyanocrates grandis (Druce, 1912)

References

Xyloryctidae
Xyloryctidae genera